Nijjar is a surname found in India. Notable people with the surname include:

 Aron Nijjar (born 1994), English cricketer
 Rob Nijjar (born 1967), Canadian politician
 Sunny Singh Nijjar, Indian actor
 Surinder Singh Nijjar (1949–2021), Indian judge

Surnames of Indian origin